Akeem Oriyomi Agbetu (born 10 March 1988) is a Nigerian professional footballer, who plays as a striker.

Career
For the 2014–2015 season Agbetu joined Le Havre AC of Ligue 2 agreeing a two-year contract.

References

External links
 
 

1988 births
Living people
Sportspeople from Lagos
Association football forwards
Nigerian footballers
Nigeria under-20 international footballers
FC Midtjylland players
Kocaelispor footballers
Samsunspor footballers
Sivasspor footballers
TKİ Tavşanlı Linyitspor footballers
Boluspor footballers
F.C. Ebedei players
Le Havre AC players
Danish Superliga players
Danish 1st Division players
Süper Lig players
TFF First League players
Ligue 2 players
Yoruba sportspeople
Nigerian expatriate footballers
Expatriate footballers in Turkey
Expatriate men's footballers in Denmark
Expatriate footballers in France